This is the list of Belgian Senators from 2003 till 2007.

Election results (18 May 2003)

By type

Senators by Right

Directly elected senators

Dutch-speaking electorate (25)

French-speaking electorate (15)

Community senators

Flemish Community (10)

French-speaking Community (10)

German-speaking Community (1)

Coopted senators

Dutch language group (6)

French language group (4)

By party

Dutch-speaking

Christian Democratic and Flemish (9)

Flemish Interest (6 [+1])

Open Flemish Liberals and Democrats / Vivant (10 [-2])

List Dedecker (2 [+2])

Different Socialist Party / Spirit (11)

French-speaking

Socialist Party (12)

Humanist Democratic Centre (3 [-1])

Ecolo (2)

National Front (1 [-1])

References

2000s in Belgium